The Government Degree College, Anantnag was established in 1950 as an Intermediate College. One of the largest colleges of northern India, it is spread over an area of 250 kanals. After functioning as an intermediate college for eleven (11) years, the college attained Degree College status in 1961-62, to cater the academic aspirations of downtrodden and backward people hailing from South Kashmir and the Chenab valley. The college was given 2(f) and 12 (B) status by the UGC in 1972. After the implementation of NCERT pattern (10+02+03) in the state in 1983-1984, the 11th and 12th classes were delinked from the institution. In the 1980s, the IGNOU Study centre (1211) was established in the college. Under the able stewardship of eminent educationists, the college has flourished and distinguished itself as one of the quality education centres and knowledge hub of the valley in the field of Higher Education and is putting in strenuous efforts to improve the academic atmosphere through innovative methods besides maintaining its glorious past. The college is making optimal use of the available resources to keep the pace and live up to the expectations of the society in general and the student community in particular, and set up new benchmarks of academic standards. During its existence of more than six decades, it has tirelessly produced a vast human resource serving the state in all walks of life. In addition to basic courses, the college runs some vocational courses/certificate courses and has introduced BBA and BMMMC. The efforts are on to bring more diversity in the courses to meet the unending demands of the Society which has also become inevitable in the light of Semesterized Choice Based Credit System (CBCS) that has been introduced as part of the reforms in Higher Education and is in vogue from academic session 2016-17.

The college was evaluated by the NAAC first in 2005, then in 2012, and then in 2021, which conferred the college with B+, A, and B+ grades, respectively. In a stride forward, the college was granted the “College with Potential for Excellence” (CPE) status by the UGC in April 2016.

Degrees

The college offers various undergraduate courses ranging from Arts, Science, to Humanities.

Here is the list of Undergraduate Courses offered by the college.

 Bachelor of Commerce (BCOM)
 Bachelor of Computer Application (BCA)
 Bachelor of Science Medical (BSC)
 Bachelor of Science Non-Medical (BSC)
 Bachelor of Arts (BA)
 Bachelor of mass media and mass communication (BMMMC)
 BA Honours in English (BA ENGLISH LITERATURE)

8.  Bachelor of Business Administration. (BBA)

9.  Bachelor of Science in Information Technology (BSC. IT)

Facilities

The college has a library, housed in a newly constructed building, and about 56,000 books in addition to subscriptions to local, national and international magazines, journals and other periodicals. Some departments also have departmental libraries.

Other academic facilities include a study center for Indira Gandhi Open University.

Physical education and first aid health care facilities are available.

Mission 
 Equip the clientele with meaningful skills.
 Work in the direction of achieving autonomy with respect to course selection, evaluation and administration.
 Keep the academic and the non-academic faculty abreast of the changing trends vis-à-vis professional expertise.
 Create conditions and infrastructure to enable "the institution with a potential for excellence" to become a university.
 Focus on societal development and research.

Alumni Association
The Alumni Association is an important organisation of an Institution. It provides a common platform for Alma Mater and Its Alumni to interact and contribute towards the progress and welfare of the Institution. With the aim to provide robust mechanism for communication between Alumni and its Institution, Govt. Degree College Alumni Association, GDCA (KAHKASHAN) was established in the Year, 2004. The college has rich history of producing skilled human resource who have served under different capacities. The Alumni of college include the Great Politicians (including Mr. Mir Qasim, Former Chief Minister of J&K), the Great Scholars (Prof. Shad Ramzan), the Great Administrators (including Dr. GN Itoo, Director Tourism, UT of J&K), the Great Lawyers & Social Workers (Mr. Sher Ali Boda), Businessmen and others. The Govt. Degree College Anantnag aims to uphold its glorious past by keeping in touch with its highly skilled Alumni. The College authorities as well as governing body of Alumni Association taking steps to involve Alumni in different activities of the college. The motto of the Govt. Degree College Alumni Association, GDCA (KAHKASHAN) is to make the college one of the best Institutions of the country.

Hostel
The College Hostel provides accommodation to at least 120 students at a time. The College gives hostel facilities to only those students who live far from their college.

References

1959 establishments in Jammu and Kashmir
Educational institutions established in 1959
Universities and colleges in Jammu and Kashmir
Anantnag
Degree colleges in Kashmir Division